Union Titus Pétange is a professional football club, based in Pétange, in south-western Luxembourg. The team was created in April 2015 as a merger of CS Pétange and FC Titus Lamadelaine who were at that time both playing in the Luxembourg Division of Honour.

European record

As of 27 August 2020

Notes
 QR: Qualifying round

Current squad

Out on loan

Current Staff
 Manager: Yannick Kakoko (1 Jul 2022 – )
 Assistant Coach: Noumouke Sissoko (1 Jul 2022 – )
 Fitness Coach: Jérôme Challe (1 Jul 2022 – )
 Coach Goalkeeper: Landry Bonnefoi (11 Mar 2020 – )

External links
Official website

Petange, Union Titus
Pétange
Petange, Union Titus
2015 establishments in Luxembourg